Paimio is a town and municipality of Finland.

It is located in the province of Western Finland and is part of the Southwest Finland region. The municipality is unilingually Finnish.

Paimio centre is called Vista, divided by the church hill to Upper Vista (Ylä-Vista) and Lower Vista (Ala-Vista).

Important buildings
Paimio is best known for Paimio Sanatorium operating as a part of Turku University Hospital. It was built in 1932 and designed by architect Alvar Aalto and originally served as a tuberculosis sanatorium.

Notable persons 
 Jarno Koskiranta, ice hockey player
 Jussi Ranta, sports journalist and producer
 Mika Ojala, footballer
 Tero Koskiranta, ice hockey player
 V. J. Sukselainen, politician

International relations

Twin towns — Sister cities
Paimio is twinned with:

  Audru Parish, Estonia
  Ljungby Municipality, Sweden  
  Zelenogorsk, Russia  
  Sovetsky, Russia  
  Tølløse, Denmark  
  Ås, Norway
  Öckerö Municipality, Sweden  
  Odenthal, Germany

References

External links

Town of Paimio – Official website 

 
Cities and towns in Finland